Gregory Thomas Smith (born December 22, 1983) is a former American professional baseball pitcher. He has played in Major League Baseball for the Oakland Athletics and the Colorado Rockies.

Baseball career

Amateur
Smith attended Louisiana State University, where he played for the LSU Tigers baseball team. In 2004, he played collegiate summer baseball with the Bourne Braves of the Cape Cod Baseball League. Smith was selected by the Arizona Diamondbacks in the sixth round in the 2005 Major League Baseball Draft.

Oakland Athletics
On December 14, 2007, Smith was traded to the Oakland Athletics along with Carlos González, Brett Anderson, Aaron Cunningham, Dana Eveland, and Chris Carter for Dan Haren and Connor Robertson. Smith made his first major league start on April 9, pitching six innings and allowing two earned runs, and earned a no decision.

In the 2008 season, he led the majors in pickoffs with 15, tying the Major League record since the stat was first tracked in 1987.

Smith would wind up finishing the season with a 7-16 record in 32 starts for the A's. He threw 190.1 innings while throwing 2 complete games.

Colorado Rockies

On November 12, 2008, Smith was traded with Huston Street and Carlos González to the Colorado Rockies for Matt Holliday.

Smith missed the first half of the season due to injury and never made it to the major league club during the year. He only pitched in 11 games between A ball and AAA in the Rockies system.

In 2010, Smith made it to the club out of spring training. He recorded his first win as a Rocky against the Mets on April 14, pitching 7 innings of 2 run ball. He also drove in 2 runs.

Smith would make 6 more starts for the Rockies before being demoted to Triple A. Smith wound up finishing with a record of 1-2 with an ERA of 6.23 in 39 innings. He also issued 24 walks with 31 strikeouts.

On April 4, 2011, following spring training, Smith was officially released by the Colorado Rockies organization.

New York Yankees
He signed a minor league contract with the New York Yankees on June 13, 2011. He was assigned to the Triple-A Scranton/Wilkes-Barre Yankees. He was released by the Yankees after posting an ERA of 4.84 in 13 games.

Boston Red Sox
Smith signed with the Boston Red Sox, and was assigned to the Triple-A Pawtucket Red Sox.

Between the Yankees and Red Sox Triple A system, Smith compiled a 5-4 record with a 4.52 ERA in 17 games.

Los Angeles Angels Of Anaheim
Smith signed a minor league contract with the Los Angeles Angels of Anaheim on February 3, 2012. Despite posting an 11-11 record and having better control throughout the season, Smith never got called up by the Angels.

Toronto Blue Jays
On December 11, 2012, the Toronto Blue Jays announced that Smith had been signed to a minor league contract.

Smith never reported to the Blue Jays AAA system Buffalo Bisons.

Philadelphia Phillies
On May 6, 2013, the Philadelphia Phillies announced that Smith signed to a minor league contract.

Smith was moved to the bullpen for the first time in his career.

On July 26, Smith threw a season high 101 pitches en route to a win. He improved his record to 5-1 in AAA.

Smith won July Honors for the Valley Pigs, going 3-0 with a 1.06 ERA in 5 starts improving his record to 7-2 for the Phillies Triple-A system.

He finished the season 8-4 with a 3.31 ERA in 23 games for the Iron Pigs.

Atlanta Braves
On November 7, 2014, Smith signed a minor league deal with the Atlanta Braves. They assigned him to the Gwinnett Braves. For the 5th season in a row, spent the majority of the season in AAA, alternating between starting and relieving. In 31 games, including 19 starts, Smith posted an ERA of 2.71 while going 6-7.

Lancaster Barnstormers
On March 3, 2016, Smith signed with the Lancaster Barnstormers of the Atlantic League of Professional Baseball. On March 29, 2016, his contract was sold to the Lamigo Monkeys.

Lamigo Monkeys
On March 24, 2016, Smith signed with the Lamigo Monkeys of the Chinese Professional Baseball League. He became a free agent after the 2016 season.

Scouting report
Smith is a changeup specialist, relying more on off speed pitches and deception rather than velocity. His fastball tops out between 86-88 MPH and he also throws a curveball.

One knock on Smith throughout his career has been the walks per nine innings, as he has amassed more than four walks per nine innings.

References

External links

1983 births
Living people
American expatriate baseball players in Taiwan
Arkansas Travelers players
Baseball players from Louisiana
Bourne Braves players
Colorado Rockies players
Colorado Springs Sky Sox players
Grand Prairie AirHogs players
Lamigo Monkeys players
Lancaster Barnstormers players
Lancaster JetHawks players
Lehigh Valley IronPigs players
LSU Tigers baseball players
Major League Baseball pitchers
Missoula Osprey players
Mobile BayBears players
Modesto Nuts players
Oakland Athletics players
Pawtucket Red Sox players
Reading Fightin Phils players
Salt Lake Bees players
Scranton/Wilkes-Barre Yankees players
Sportspeople from Alexandria, Louisiana
Sacramento River Cats players
Tennessee Smokies players
Tucson Sidewinders players
Tulsa Drillers players